Frederik Tiffels (born 20 May 1995) is a German professional ice hockey forward for EHC Red Bull München of the Deutsche Eishockey Liga (DEL). He was drafted 167th overall in the 2015 NHL Entry Draft by the Pittsburgh Penguins.

Playing career
Tiffels played as a youth in his native Germany, with Jungadler Mannheim, before opting to continue his development as a junior in the United States. He played in the United States Hockey League with the Muskegon Lumberjacks, Fargo Force, and the Cedar Rapids RoughRiders before committing to a collegiate career with the Western Michigan Broncos in the National Collegiate Hockey Conference.

After completion of his junior season with the Broncos in 2016–17, Tiffels concluded his collegiate career by agreeing to a two-year, entry-level contract with the defending Stanley Cup champions, the Pittsburgh Penguins, on 22 June 2017. In the 2017–18 season, he saw the ice in 12 AHL contests (two goals, one assist) for the Wilkes-Barre/Scranton Penguins, while appearing in 44 ECHL games (16 goals, 17 assists) for the Wheeling Nailers.

On 22 September 2018, he inked a three-year deal with Kölner Haie of the German Deutsche Eishockey Liga (DEL).

International play
Tiffels participated for the German national team at the 2017 IIHF World Championship and the 2018 IIHF World Championship.

Career statistics

Regular season and playoffs

International

References

External links
 

1995 births
Living people
Cedar Rapids RoughRiders players
Sportspeople from Cologne
Fargo Force players
German expatriates in the United States
German ice hockey forwards
Kölner Haie players
EHC München players
Muskegon Lumberjacks players
Pittsburgh Penguins draft picks
Western Michigan Broncos men's ice hockey players
Wheeling Nailers players
Wilkes-Barre/Scranton Penguins players
Ice hockey players at the 2022 Winter Olympics
Olympic ice hockey players of Germany